Wilbrod "Willie" Desjardins (born February 11, 1957) is a Canadian professional ice hockey coach and player. He is currently head coach and general manager of the WHL's Medicine Hat Tigers. He has also been the head coach of the NHL's Vancouver Canucks from 2014 to 2017 and the interim head coach for the Los Angeles Kings for the 2018–19 season.  In July 2017, he was named head of the coaching staff for Canada's men's team at the 2018 Winter Olympics in Pyeongchang, South Korea.

Playing career
Desjardins began his hockey career playing in the Saskatchewan Junior Hockey League (SJHL) for the Moose Jaw Canucks from 1971 to 1974 and split the 1974-75 season between the Moose Jaw Canucks and the Swift Current Broncos (WHL). He played in the Western Canada Hockey League (WCHL) for the Lethbridge Broncos from 1975 through 1977. He followed his junior hockey career by studying at the University of Saskatchewan and played with the Saskatchewan Huskies under then head coach Dave King, serving as captain of the 1982-83 University of Saskatchewan Huskies hockey team that won the Canadian university championship, after losing back-to-back national championship finals in previous seasons. King recommended him to Alex Andjelic, head coach of Vissers Nijmegen in the Netherlands. Desjardins spent the 1983/84 season in Nijmegen and won, as captain, the first Dutch championship with the club.

Coaching career
Desjardins began his coaching career at the University of Calgary in 1985 as assistant coach and became head coach in 1989. He then coached the Seibu Bears in Japan. He then returned to Canada and became head coach of the Saskatoon Blades, replacing Donn Clark midway through the 1997–98 season. He was then offered a job as an assistant coach for the Canada men's national team.

Once hired by the Medicine Hat Tigers, Desjardins was instrumental in the Tigers' first playoff appearance in five years in the 2002–03 season, leading them to a Memorial Cup appearance and their 4th WHL championship in 2003–04, and a 96-point Eastern Conference regular season champion 2004–05 season. Desjardins took on the duties of general manager for the 2005–06 season.

Desjardins was awarded the Dunc McCallum Memorial Trophy for the Coach of the Year in the Western Hockey League and the Canadian Hockey League.

In 2009, he was the assistant coach of Team Canada's World Junior Gold medal team, under head coach Pat Quinn and alongside fellow assistant coaches Guy Boucher and Dave Cameron. Desjardins was the head coach of Team Canada's 2010 World Junior Ice Hockey Championships team.

From 2010 to 2012, Desjardins served as the associate head coach of the Dallas Stars of the National Hockey League before being selected as the head coach of their AHL team in Cedar Park, Texas in June 2012. On June 17, 2014, he led his Texas Stars team to their first Calder Cup Championship.

On June 23, 2014, Desjardins was hired as the head coach for the Vancouver Canucks, replacing John Tortorella, who was dismissed as head coach after one season. On April 10, 2017, he was fired after the team missed the playoffs for the second consecutive season, along with assistants Perry Pearn and Doug Lidster. Desjardins posted a record of 109–110–27 in three seasons with the club.

On July 25, 2017, he was named head coach of Canada's men's team at the 2018 Winter Olympics in Pyeongchang, South Korea, with his university head coach Dave King as an assistant. In December 2017, he led Team Canada to gold at the Spengler Cup in Davos.

On November 4, 2018, Desjardins was named interim head coach by the Los Angeles Kings after they fired John Stevens. Desjardins' presence did not lead to the team improving as the Kings went 27–34–8 and finished in last place in the Western Conference. One day after the season ended, the Kings announced that they would not bring Desjardins back for the 2019–20 season.

On May 31, 2019, it was announced that Desjardins had been re-hired as head coach and general manager of the Medicine Hat Tigers.

Personal life
Desjardins holds bachelor of education (BEd) and a master of social work (MSW) degrees. He and his wife, Rhonda, have  two sons and a daughter. Desjardins is also the owner of a golf course, two RV parks, and a mini golf course. His daughter,  Sheehan, studied journalism, has a degree in broadcasting, and works for Canadian Broadcasting Corporation, based out of Prince Edward Island. His youngest son has a decorated League Gaming career, winning 3 LG Stanley Cups, the first person in PSN history to achieve such a feat. In addition to his LG success, he led his team to a first place finish in the CBJ Gaming Summer Skate.

Head coaching record

WHL

AHL

NHL

References

External links
Medicine Hat Tigers homepage
 

1957 births
Living people
Canada men's national ice hockey team coaches
Canadian ice hockey centres
Canadian ice hockey coaches
Dallas Stars coaches
Ice hockey people from Saskatchewan
Lethbridge Broncos players
Los Angeles Kings coaches
Medicine Hat Tigers coaches
Saskatchewan Huskies ice hockey players
Saskatoon Blades coaches
Vancouver Canucks coaches
Ice hockey coaches at the 2018 Winter Olympics
Medalists at the 2018 Winter Olympics
Olympic bronze medalists for Canada
Olympic medalists in ice hockey